Lubinski is a surname. Notable people with the surname include:
Christina Lubinski (born 1979), German historian
David Lubinski, American psychologist
Kurt Lubinski (1899–1969), German-Dutch photojournalist
Rudolf Lubinski (1873–1935), Croatian architect
Sharon Lubinski, United States Marshal
Wojciech Lubiński (born 1969), Polish military physician
Jorge Wagensberg Lubinski (1948–2018), Spanish physicist